"Ohio" is a protest song and counterculture anthem written and composed by Neil Young in reaction to the Kent State shootings of May 4, 1970, and performed by Crosby, Stills, Nash & Young. It was released as a single, backed with Stephen Stills's "Find the Cost of Freedom", peaking at number 14 on the US Billboard Hot 100 and number 16 in Canada. Although a live version of "Ohio" was included on the group's 1971 double album 4 Way Street, the studio versions of both songs did not appear on an LP until the group's compilation So Far was released in 1974. The song also appeared on the Neil Young compilation albums Decade, released in 1977, and Greatest Hits, released in 2004.

The song also appears on Neil Young's Live at Massey Hall album, which he recorded in 1971 but remained unreleased until 2007. A version also appears on Young's 1972  release "journey through the past" soundtrack.

Recording
Young wrote the lyrics to "Ohio" after seeing the photos of the incident in Life Magazine. On the evening that the group entered Record Plant Studios in Los Angeles, the song had already been rehearsed, and the quartet—with their new rhythm section of Calvin Samuels and Johnny Barbata—recorded it live in just a few takes. During the same session, they recorded the single's equally direct b-side, Stephen Stills's ode to the war's dead, "Find the Cost of Freedom."

The record was mastered with the participation of the four principals, rush-released by Atlantic and heard on the radio with only a few weeks' delay (even though the group's hit song "Teach Your Children" was already on the charts at the time). In his liner notes for the Decade retrospective, Young termed the Kent State incident as 'probably the biggest lesson ever learned at an American place of learning' and reported that "David Crosby cried when we finished this take." In the fade, Crosby's voice—with a tone evocative of keening—can be heard with the words "Four!", "Why?" and "How many more?".

According to the liner notes in Greatest Hits, the track was recorded by Bill Halverson on May 21, 1970, at Record Plant Studio 3 in Hollywood.

Lyrics and reaction

An article in The Guardian in 2010 describes the song as the 'greatest protest record' and 'the pinnacle of a very 1960s genre,' while also saying 'The revolution never came.' President Richard Nixon, criticized in the song, won a landslide reelection in 1972, which included winning the 1972 United States presidential election in Ohio by a margin of over 21%.

The lyrics help evoke the turbulent mood of horror, outrage, and shock in the wake of the shootings, especially the line "four dead in Ohio," repeated throughout the song. "Tin soldiers and Nixon coming" refers to the Kent State shootings, where Ohio National Guard officers shot and killed four students during a protest against the Vietnam War. Crosby once stated that Young keeping Nixon's name in the lyrics was "the bravest thing I ever heard." The American counterculture took the group as its own after this song, giving the four a status as leaders and spokesmen they would enjoy to a varying extent for the rest of the decade.

After the single's release, it was banned from some AM radio stations including in the state of Ohio, because of the challenge to the Nixon Administration but received airplay on underground FM stations in larger cities and college towns. Today, the song receives regular airplay on classic rock stations. The song was selected as the 395th Greatest Song of All Time by Rolling Stone in 2010. In 2009, the song was inducted into the Grammy Hall of Fame.

Personnel
 David Crosby — vocals; rhythm guitar on "Ohio"
 Stephen Stills — vocals, guitars
 Graham Nash — vocals
 Neil Young — vocals, guitars
 Calvin Samuels — bass on "Ohio"
 John Barbata — drums on "Ohio"

Charts

Weekly charts

See also
List of anti-war songs

References

External links
Neil Young Ohio Lyric Analysis. Accessed on March 26, 2007.

1970 songs
1970 singles
Neil Young songs
Crosby, Stills, Nash & Young songs
Atlantic Records singles
Kent State shootings
Songs of the Vietnam War
Anti-war songs
Protest songs
Songs written by Neil Young
Songs inspired by deaths
Songs based on actual events
Songs about Ohio
Music of Ohio
Songs about Richard Nixon